Indigenous peoples in Paraguay, or Native Paraguayans, include 17 ethnic groups belonging to five language families. While only a 1.7% of Paraguay's population is fully indigenous, 75% of the population identifies as being partially of indigenous descent; however, the majority do not identify as being indigenous but as Mestizos. Most of the native population lives in the northwestern part of the country, the Gran Chaco.

Population
The Second National Indigenous Census, conducted in 2002, recording approximately 87,099 people, or 1.7% of the country's population, as being indigenous; however, as many as 75% of the Paraguayan population is mestizo, that is of partial Indian descent. Since the late 20th century, the indigenous population is growing faster than the rest of the population. As of 2002, 47.1% of the native population was 14 years old or younger.

Settlement

An increasing percentage of the registered indigenous population lives in the northwestern region of Paraguay. The 1981 census reported 32.8% of the indigenous peoples living there, while 44.2% lived there in 1992, and 50.7% in 2002. The majority of indigenous peoples live in rural areas in 412 indigenous communities.

Languages

Indigenous Paraguayan languages belong to five language families: Guarani, Guaycuru, Maskoy, Mataco-Mataguayo, and Zamuco. The Guarani language, along with Spanish, is an official language of Paraguay and is spoken by 90% of the population.

Social issues
Literacy rates are low among indigenous peoples in Paraguay, who have an illiteracy rate of 51% compared to the 7.1% rate of the general population.

Access to clean drinking water is a major challenge. Only 2.5% of Paraguay's indigenous population has access to drinking water and only 9.5% have electricity.

Tribes

Aché
Abipón
Ayoreo
Chané
Chamacoco (Ishir)
Ebytoso
Tomáraho

Chorote
Guana
Guaraní
Lengua (Enxet)
Nivaclé (Chulupí)
Macá
Mbayá
Pai-Tavyter
Sanapaná
Toba
Zamuco

See also

Guaraní War
India Juliana
Paraguayan Indian art

Notes

External links
Instituto Paraguayo del Indigena 
"Paraguay's Indigenous Peoples in Peril", Amnesty International
Assessment for Indigenous Peoples in Paraguay
Indigenous Squatter Communities Organise Self-Help, InterPress Service Agency

 
Paraguay
Ethnic groups in Paraguay
Gran Chaco